Tibitanus is a genus of African running crab spiders that was first described by Eugène Louis Simon in 1907.  it contains only two species, found only in Africa and Namibia: T. nomas and T. sexlineatus.

See also
 List of Philodromidae species

References

Araneomorphae genera
Philodromidae
Spiders of Africa